= Almura =

Town of ancient Lydia

Coordinates: 38°05′41″N 27°37′30″E

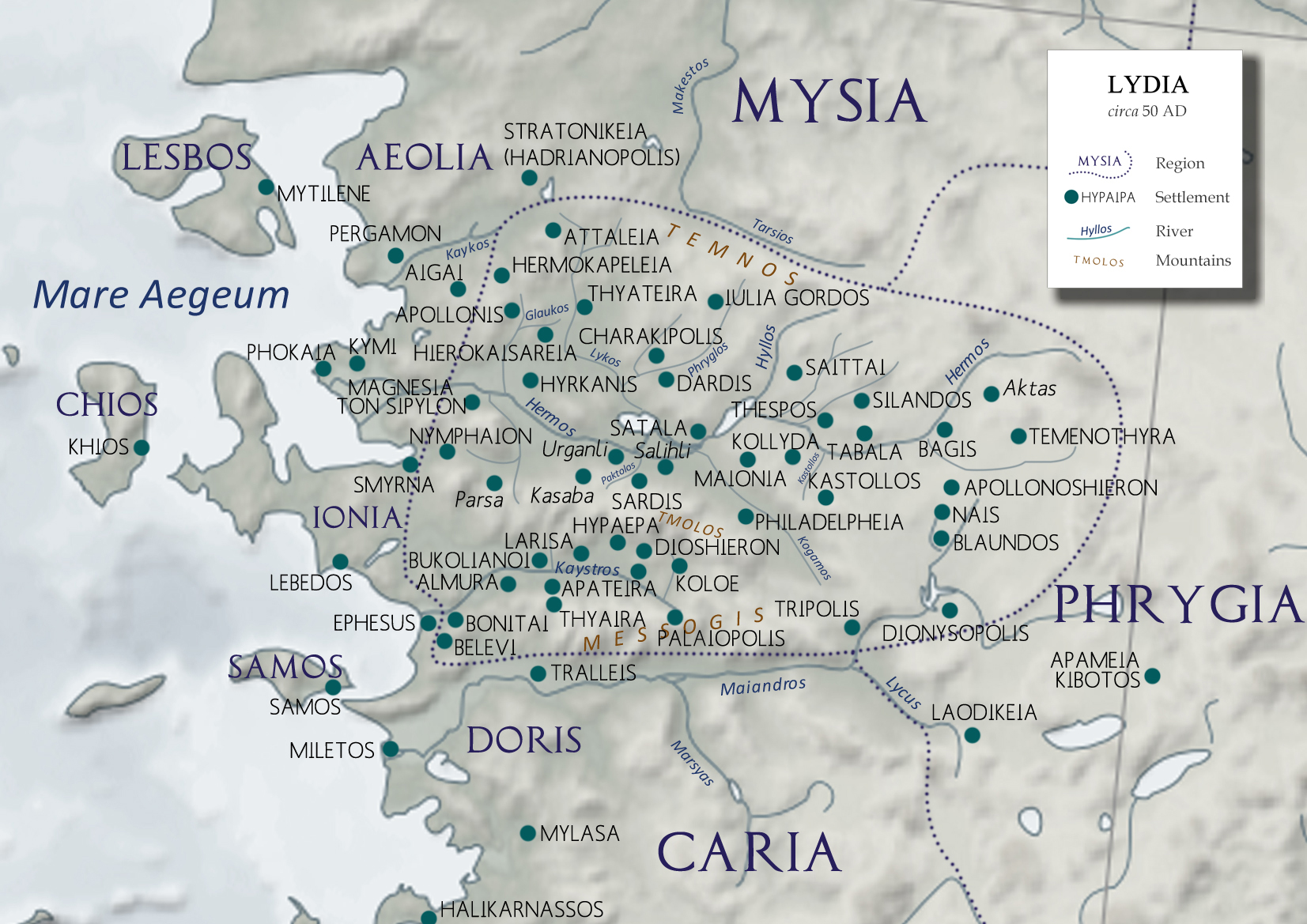
Lydia in about 50CE.

Almura or Almoura was a town of ancient Lydia, inhabited during Roman times.

Its site is located near Eskioba, Asiatic Turkey.
